The history of England is the study of the human past in one of Europe's oldest and most influential national territories.

History of England may also refer to:

 The History of England (Echard), early-18th-century book by Laurence Echard
 The History of England (Hume book), 1754 book by David Hume
 The History of England (Austen), 1791 parody by Jane Austen
 A complete history of England, from the descent of Julius Caesar, to the Treaty of Aix la Chapelle, 1748, a ten-volume history by Tobias Smollett
 The History of England from the Accession of James the Second, 1848 multi-volume work by Lord Macaulay
 A Child's History of England, 1851-54 three book series by Charles Dickens, intended for adults despite the name
History of England from the Fall of Wolsey to the Defeat of the Spanish Armada, 1893 multi-volume work by James Anthony Froude
 History of England (Trevelyn book), 1926 book by G. M. Trevelyan
 A Shortened History of England (1942), abridged version of above
 A History of England (1997–2002), a series of reprints of twelve classic, magisterial volumes of different periods of English history

See also
History of Britain (disambiguation)